Walter Adams (22 May 1887 – 3 January 1939) was a British wrestler. He competed in the 1908 Summer Olympics.

References

External links
 

Wrestlers at the 1908 Summer Olympics
British male sport wrestlers
Olympic wrestlers of Great Britain
1887 births
1939 deaths